Ajoba is a 2014 Indian Marathi-language film directed by Sujay Dahake and written by Gauri Bapat. It is allegedly based on true events  and relates to how a leopard trekked from Malshej Ghat to Mumbai in 29 days. Ajoba was rescued from a well and a tracking device was fixed on his neck, before being released back into the wild.

Plot

Cast

References

External links
 

2010s Marathi-language films
2014 films
Films about cats
Films set in Maharashtra
Films set in Mumbai
Forest administration in India
Indian films based on actual events